Peter Reyner Banham Hon. FRIBA (2 March 1922 – 19 March 1988) was an English architectural critic and writer best known for his theoretical treatise Theory and Design in the First Machine Age (1960) and for his 1971 book Los Angeles:  The Architecture of Four Ecologies. In the latter he categorized the Los Angeles experience into four ecological models (Surfurbia, Foothills, The Plains of Id, and Autopia) and explored the distinct architectural cultures of each. A frequent visitor to the United States from the early 1960s, he relocated there in 1976.

Early life and education

[Peter] Reyner Banham was born in Norwich, England to Percy Banham, a gas engineer, and Violet Frances Maud Reyner. He was educated at Norwich School and gained an engineering scholarship with the Bristol Aeroplane Company, where he spent much of the Second World War. In Norwich he gave art lectures, wrote reviews for the local paper and was involved with the Maddermarket Theatre. In 1949 Banham entered the Courtauld Institute of Art in London where he studied under Anthony Blunt, Sigfried Giedion and Nikolaus Pevsner. Pevsner, who was his doctoral supervisor, invited Banham to study the history of modern architecture, following his own work Pioneers of the Modern Movement (1936).

Career
Having previously written regular exhibition reviews for ArtReview, then titled Art News and Review, Banham began working for the Architectural Review in 1952. Notably in its December 1955 issue, Banham contributed an essay titled "The New Brutalism", in which he sought to stylistically define New Brutalism. His hypotheses became widely discussed and debated topics among members of Team X and other groups involved in urban planning at the time. Banham also had connections with the Independent Group, the 1956 This Is Tomorrow art exhibition – considered by many to the birth of pop art – and the exponents of Brutalist architecture, which he documented in his 1966 book The New Brutalism: Ethic or Aesthetic?. Before this, in Theory and Design in the First Machine Age, he had cut across mentor Pevsner's main theories, linking modernism to built structures in which the 'functionalism' was actually subject to formal structures. Later, he wrote a Guide to Modern Architecture (1962, later titled Age of the Masters, a Personal View of Modern Architecture). Banham predicted a "second age" of the machine and mass consumption. The Architecture of the Well-Tempered Environment (1969) follows Giedion's Mechanization Takes Command (1948), putting the development of technologies such as electricity and air conditioning ahead of the classic account of structures. In the 1960s, Cedric Price, Peter Cook, and the Archigram group also found this to be an absorbing arena of thought.

Green thinking (Los Angeles: The Architecture of Four Ecologies) and then the oil shock of 1973 affected him. The 'postmodern' was for him uneasy, and he evolved into becoming the conscience of postwar British architecture. He broke with utopian and technical formalism. Scenes in America Deserta (1982) talks of open spaces and his anticipation of a 'modern' future. In A Concrete Atlantis: U.S. Industrial Building and European Modern Architecture, 1900–1925 (1986) Banham demonstrated the influence of American grain elevators and "Daylight" factories on the Bauhaus and other modernist projects in Europe.

Banham was a prolific journalist (of some 750 articles), both within and outside of the architectural press, including regular columns in New Statesman (1958-63) and New Society (1966-88). Selections of his journalism articles were collected in Design by Choice, edited by Penny Sparke and A Critic Writes (which includes a full bibliography), edited by his wife Mary Banham and others.

Teaching
Banham taught at the Bartlett School of Architecture, University College London (1964-76) and the State University of New York (SUNY) Buffalo (1976 to 1980), and through the 1980s at the University of California, Santa Cruz. He had been appointed the Sheldon H. Solow Professor of the History of Architecture at the Institute of Fine Arts, New York University shortly before his death, but he never taught there. In 2014 The Bartlett established a named Chair appointment of the Reyner Banham Professor of Architectural History and Theory.

Awards and tributes
He was featured in the short documentary Reyner Banham Loves Los Angeles; in his book on Los Angeles, Banham said that he learned to drive so he could read the city in the original.

In 1988 he was awarded the Sir Misha Black award and was added to the College of Medallists.

Criticism
In 2003, Nigel Whiteley published a critical biography of Banham, Reyner Banham: Historian of the Immediate Future, in which he gives an in-depth overview of Banham's work and ideas.

Bibliography
 

"The New Brutalism". The Architectural Review. 1955.

 

 “Hawks, Doves, and Flights of Fancy.” Wilson Quarterly vol. 3, no. 1, 1979, pp. 128–34. online
  “The New Brutalism.” October, vol. 136, 2011, pp. 19–28. online

References

External links
 52 minute episode from the BBC series One pair of eyes. Banham narrates a video tour of Los Angeles; the program incorporates interviews with authors Henry Miller and Norman Mailer, among others.

Reyner Banham Papers at the Getty Research Institute

English architecture writers
Architectural theoreticians
University of California, Santa Cruz faculty
1922 births
1988 deaths
People educated at Norwich School
Alumni of the Courtauld Institute of Art
Academics of University College London
20th-century English architects
Fellows of the Royal Institute of British Architects